8AM is the second maxi-single by Japanese rock band Coldrain, it was released on April 8, 2009. The song 8AM was used as the ending theme for the anime Hajime no Ippo: New Challenger.

Track listing
All lyrics written by Masato Hayakawa, all music written by Masato Hayakawa and Ryo Yokochi.

CD

 DVD

Personnel
  – lead vocals, lyricist, producer
  – lead guitar, programming
  – rhythm guitar, backing vocals
  – bass guitar, backing vocals
  – drums

Charts

References 

Coldrain songs
2009 singles
2009 songs
Songs written by Masato Hayakawa